Andrew Paul Cherry (born March 16, 1986, in Bloomington, Indiana) is an American contemporary Christian singer-songwriter raised in Bloomington, Indiana and Charlotte, North Carolina. In 2012 Cherry released the album entitled Nothing Left to Fear, his first full-length studio album with Essential record label. To create the album, Cherry partnered with award-winning producer Jason Ingram of One Sonic Society. Cherry had the No. 2 most played song on Air 1 for the week of April 28, 2012, and had the No. 4 most played song on K-LOVE for the week of April 8, 2012 with the song "Our God's Alive".

Background 
Cherry's parents are Paul and Mary Beth, and he has three older sisters named Christine, Rebecca and Sarah.

Stereo Subversion reported that Cherry was "leading worship by day and playing bars at night. Shortly after high school, Cherry got up to sing one morning and felt something just wasn’t right. 'I didn’t want to be there,' he has since said. 'I thought, I'm wasting my time.’" Lastly, "Cherry realized he was in the midst of something bigger than himself, and decided to get on board and see where it led."

Cherry was on "The Love in Between Tour" with Matt Maher and Laura Story, and was on the  "Grace Amazing Tour" with Jimmy Needham and Trip Lee. In addition, Cherry will be doing a solo 20-city tour.  CCM Magazine said Cherry is a "25-year old troubadour [that] blends the best of both lyrical worlds over stomping and soft spoken guitar strums, all nestled in the crisp production of Jason Ingram".  CCM Magazine notes how "Cherry invites listeners to lay their worries at the foot of the cross and simply raise their hands in praise."

In August 2014, Cherry took a full-time worship leader position at Fairfax Community Church in Fairfax, Virginia where he is currently employed. He leads weekend worship and coordinates the worship team at Fairfax Community Church.

Music play 
Cherry song "Our God's Alive" was peaked at the No. 2 top song position on Air 1 for the week of April 28, 2012. On K-LOVE, the song was peaked at No. 4 top song position for the week of April 8, 2012.

Discography

Albums

Singles

Personal life 
Cherry married Michelle Conley on October 8, 2010.

The Voice 
Andy competed in Season 7 of the national reality TV show, The Voice, but failed to have a chair turn, resulting in his elimination.

References

External links 
 

1986 births
American performers of Christian music
Songwriters from Indiana
Songwriters from North Carolina
Essential Records (Christian) artists
Living people
Musicians from Bloomington, Indiana
Musicians from Charlotte, North Carolina
Writers from Bloomington, Indiana
Writers from Charlotte, North Carolina
21st-century American singers
21st-century American male singers
American male songwriters